Classic Moments is a studio album by American singer Patti LaBelle. It was her second full-length release with Island Def Jam's Def Soul Classics imprint and released on June 21, 2005 in the United States. The album features LaBelle's renditions of modern pop, soul and R&B songs, mostly ballads, including her versions of "Love Don't Live Here Anymore", "She's Out of My Life", "Didn't I (Blow Your Mind This Time)" and "I'll Stand by You".

Released a year after LaBelle's previous album, Timeless Journey (2004), it peaked at number 24 on the US Billboard 200 and number five on Top R&B/Hip-Hop Albums, while her version of Aretha and Carolyn Franklin's "Ain't No Way", a duet with Mary J. Blige, entered the R&B charts peaking at number sixty-eight.

Critical reception

Allmusic editor Andy Kellman called Classic Moments "an all-covers affair with a few pleasant surprises. While it won't shock fans to hear LaBelle in great form, some of the material the singer takes on couldn't have been all that expected. Soul classics like "Didn't I (Blow Your Mind This Time)" (hindered by a rather plain arrangement) and "Love Don't Live Here Anymore" (sounding entirely modern, even with the disco zaps and galactic keyboard effects) are natural picks, but a few other songs make this more than an average covers album, which are often spat out like contractual obligations [...] The set's not spotless, but it's more than a stopgap release and will please LaBelle's followers." People wrote that "with her range and power, LaBelle can make any song her own [...] Not everything works, including her duet with Elton John on “Your Song,” and the disc could use more uptempo cuts like the funky “You Gonna Make Me Love Somebody Else.” Still, there are more than enough memorable moments."

Track listing

Charts

References

2005 albums
Patti LaBelle albums
Albums produced by Babyface (musician)